Elias Raymond was a French Dominican friar from Toulouse. He was named Procurator of the Order under Master Simon de Langres. On 21 February 1365 Raymond was named Vicar of the Order by Pope Urban V.

At the time of the Western Schism, he adhered to the party of the antipope Clement VII. Raymond died in Avignon on 31 December 1389.

French Dominicans
Masters of the Order of Preachers
14th-century French people
1389 deaths
Year of birth unknown